Malou is a feminine given name and a French surname. As a given name, it is a contraction of the compound name Marie-Louise. The name has been well used for girls in Denmark and in the Philippines, where it is considered a contraction of María Lourdes. Malu is a variant spelling.

People with the given name Malou
Malou Aamund, Danish politician.
Malou de Guzman, Filipino actress.
Malou Hansson, Swedish actress and model.
Malou Jacob, playwright
Malou Prytz, Swedish singer
Malou (model), Danish actress

People with the surname
Jules Malou, Belgian statesman.

People nicknamed Malou
Marie Louise Asseu (1966-2016), Ivorian  actress, film director and producer

See also
Château Malou, a neoclassical building in the municipality of Woluwe-Saint-Lambert in Brussels, Belgium.
Tropical Storm Malou (disambiguation)
Malou Park, an urban park in Brussels, Belgium.
Malou, German short film by Adi Wojaczek and Patrick Mölleken, 2019

Notes

Feminine given names